Miao Xin Vihara, also known as Good Hearts Garden, is a Buddhist community in Singapore. The community established by Venerable Jian Xin. The present premises are located at Eunos, Singapore.

Overview
Leksim Ling was founded as a coaching and counselling service by Venerable Jian Xin offering group facilitation and transformation workshops, before a series of basic dharma courses began conducted in Singapore till today

See also
Buddhism in Singapore

References

Buddhist organizations
Buddhist temples in Singapore